Edi Maia (born 10 November 1987 in Setúbal) is a Portuguese pole vaulter. He competed in the pole vault event at the 2012 Summer Olympics.

His outdoor personal best in the event is 5.70 metres achieved in Lisbon in 2013, which is the Portuguese record. His indoor best of 5.70 metres, achieved in Orléans in 2014, is also a current national record.

Competition record

References

External links
 

1987 births
Living people
Sportspeople from Setúbal
Olympic athletes of Portugal
Athletes (track and field) at the 2012 Summer Olympics
Portuguese male pole vaulters
S.L. Benfica athletes